Bulli Creek is a locality in the Toowoomba Region, Queensland, Australia.

Geography 
The watercourse Bulli Creek, as which the locality is presumably named, rises in the north of the locality and flows north where it becomes a tributary of Western Creek, then Weir River within the Murray-Darling basin.

The Gore Highway passes through the locality from east (Wattle Ridge) to west (Kindon). Much of the north of the locality is within the Western Creek State Forest while much of the south of the locality is within the Bulli State Forest. The remaining land is used for farming.

References 

Toowoomba Region
Localities in Queensland